McKinley Exchange Corporate Center is a 5-story commercial building, part of a mixed-use complex developed by Ayala Land Inc. as part of the  redevelopment and rebranding of the city of Makati. It is located along McKinley Road corner EDSA in Barangay Dasmariñas and was slated to become the new transport hub of Makati. It is also one of the newest upcoming PEZA-accredited zones, soon to be at par with other 39 Makati zones such as Zuellig Building, RCBC Plaza, and Makati Stock Exchange.

Unlike typical commercial offices in the Philippines, tenants or locators of the McKinley Exchange Corporate Center are required to regularly update the Makati government with a list of their labor requirements, so they can hire and prioritize qualified city residents. Tenants are also required to provide a list of training schools or centers that can teach disqualified candidates so they can be reconsidered for employment.

Building specifications
McKinley Exchange Corporate Center is a Grade A building that has a  floor plate to accommodate BPO and multinational company space requirements. It is also certified by the Philippine Economic Zone Authority (PEZA). It currently houses a branch of Telus International Philippines.

Transportation
Bonifacio Transport Corporation has established a terminal at this building for its bus service (called the BGC Bus) along McKinley Road to provide access to different points in Bonifacio Global City and in Makati Central Business District.

A few meters from the McKinley Exchange Corporate Center lie the Ayala MRT station, where passengers can take the MRT-3, and One Ayala, located across EDSA at the Glorietta complex. Passengers may also board the EDSA Carousel and other buses at the curbside, particularly beside the building for northbound and at One Ayala for southbound.

Passengers can also board a jeepney bound for Washington Street in Barangay Pio del Pilar via Ayala Avenue behind the building. Jeepneys bound for Market! Market! can also be found at its terminal across McKinley Road. Taxis and shuttles also load and unload passengers at the building's driveway.

References

Buildings and structures in Makati
Bus stations in Metro Manila
Office buildings completed in 2014
Office buildings in Metro Manila
21st-century architecture in the Philippines